Patriarch Parthenius may refer to:

 Parthenius I of Constantinople, Ecumenical Patriarch of Constantinople in 1639–1644
 Patriarch Parthenius I of Alexandria, Greek Patriarch of Alexandria in 1678–1688
 Parthenius II of Constantinople, Ecumenical Patriarch of Constantinople in 1644–1646 and 1648–1651
 Parthenius II of Alexandria, Greek Patriarch of Alexandria in 1788–1805
 Parthenius III of Constantinople, Ecumenical Patriarch of Constantinople in 1656–1657
 Patriarch Parthenius III of Alexandria, Greek Orthodox Patriarch of Alexandria in 1987–1996
 Parthenius IV of Constantinople, Ecumenical Patriarch of Constantinople in 1657–1659, 1665–1667, 1671, 1675–1676 and 1684–1685